The following highways are numbered 682:

United States

Canada
 Saskatchewan Highway 682